Hush Hush is an Indian Hindi-language drama streaming television series created and directed by Tanuja Chandra. The series stars Juhi Chawla, Ayesha Jhulka, Karishma Tanna, Kritika Kamra, Shahana Goswami and Soha Ali Khan in the lead. It was produced under the banner of Abundantia Entertainment, and premiered on Amazon Prime Video on 22 September 2022.

Cast
 Juhi Chawla as Ishi
 Ayesha Jhulka as Meera Yadav 
 Karishma Tanna as Geeta
 Kritika Kamra as Dolly
 Shahana Goswami as Zaira 
 Soha Ali Khan as Saiba
 Nisha Jindal as Rekha
 Bharti Sharma as Manjit Dalal
 Kumkum Jain as Veena
 Nitish Kapoor as Aditya 
 Jamini Pathak as Kashi
 Vibha Chibber as ACP Madhu
 Abhijeet Singh as Sub-inspector Karan Singh 
 Vedant Chibber as Zyan, Saiba and Ranveer's son
 Chaitanya Choudhry as Ranveer, Saiba's Husband
 Gaurav Dwivedi as Vinayak
 Kavya Trehan as Meher
 Ariana Dogra

Episodes

Series overview

Season 1 (2022)

Production

Development
The announcement of the series was made by Amazon Prime in the first week of March 2021 to be directed by Tanuja Chandra, starring Juhi Chawla, Ayesha Jhulka, Soha Ali Khan, Karishma Tanna, Kritika Kamra and Shahana Goswami.

The principal photography of the film started in mid-September 2021. Filming took place in New Delhi, Gurgaon, and Mumbai, before wrapping up in April 2022.

Release
The trailer of the series was released on 13 September 2022. The series consisting of seven episodes premiered on Amazon Prime Video from 22 September 2022.

Critical reception
ThePrints Tina Das rated the series three out of five stars, writing that Hush Hush "loses steam" after the first four episodes. The entertainment website 123telugu.com gave the series 2.75 stars out of five, concluding that despite "decent twists and splendid performances," the series was let down by "uneven execution, abrupt ending, and the palling mid-portions."

See also
 List of Amazon India originals
 List of Amazon Prime Video original programming

References

External links
 Hush Hush on Prime Video

Indian drama television series
Hindi-language television shows